The Forest and Annex is a historic apartment building at 901-905 Forest Avenue in Evanston, Illinois. Owner Alfred B. Andrews built The Forest in 1909 and added the annex to the original building in 1912. Andrews would later author Evanston's early zoning ordinances, and he planned his building accordingly, with a spacious lawn providing plenty of room between it and the street. The building has a Prairie School design with a horizontal emphasis, patterned brick, and wide eaves. The 11 apartments in the building all included features such as wood paneling and flooring, fireplaces, and rooms for housekeepers.

The building was added to the National Register of Historic Places on March 15, 1984.

References

Buildings and structures on the National Register of Historic Places in Cook County, Illinois
Residential buildings on the National Register of Historic Places in Illinois
Buildings and structures in Evanston, Illinois
Residential buildings completed in 1909
Prairie School architecture in Illinois
Apartment buildings in Illinois